Eric Burns is a media critic, journalist, writer, and former television pundit for Fox News.

Eric Burns may also refer to:
 Eric E. Burns, media consultant, President of Media Matters for America from 2008 to 2011

See also
 Eric Byrnes (born 1976), retired professional baseball player
 Eric Byrne (born 1947), Irish politician
 Burns (surname)